The IWGP Junior Heavyweight Tag Team Championship is a professional wrestling tag team championship owned by the New Japan Pro-Wrestling (NJPW) promotion. "IWGP" is the acronym of NJPW's governing body, the International Wrestling Grand Prix. The title was introduced on August 8, 1998, at a NJPW live event. The IWGP Junior Heavyweight Tag Team Championship is not the only tag team title contested for in NJPW; the IWGP Tag Team Championship is also sanctioned by NJPW. According to NJPW's official website, the Junior Heavyweight Tag Team Championship is listed as the "IWGP Jr. Tag Class", while the IWGP Tag Team Championship is considered the  "IWGP Heavy Weight Class". Being a professional wrestling championship, the title is won as a result of a predetermined outcome.

Title changes happen mostly at NJPW-promoted events. The inaugural champions were Shinjiro Otani and Tatsuhito Takaiwa, who defeated Dr. Wagner Jr. and Koji Kanemoto on August 8, 1998, in the final of a tournament. Rocky Romero holds the record for most reigns by an individual wrestler, with eight. At seven reigns, The Young Bucks (Matt Jackson and Nick Jackson) hold the record for the most by a team. Gedo and Jado's combined four reign lengths add up to 960 days—the most of any team. NJPW keep track of all championship title defenses per reign, which is unlike most mainstream wrestling organizations. They also hold the most total defenses as champions, with 15. Ryusuke Taguchi holds the records for most combined days and most total defenses by an individual wrestler, with 990 days and 17 defenses respectively across his 7 reigns with 4 different partners. Apollo 55 (Prince Devitt and Ryusuke Taguchi) hold the record for most defenses during a single reign, with 7. The Great Sasuke and Jushin Thunder Liger's only reign, Minoru and Prince Devitt's first reign, El Samurai and Koji Kanemoto's only reign, Apollo 55's fourth reign, Jushin Thunder Liger's sixth and Tiger Mask's first reign, The Young Bucks' second, fourth, and seventh reigns, Roppongi Vice's (Beretta and Rocky Romero) first, second and fourth reigns, Matt Sydal and Ricochet's first and second reigns and Roppongi 3K's (Sho and Yoh) second reign share the record for the fewest successful defenses, with zero. At 348 days, Otani and Takaiwa's second reign is the longest in the title's history. Minoru and Prince Devitt's first reign is the shortest, at 21 days. Overall, there have been 70 reigns shared among 52 wrestlers, who made up 39 different teams. United Empire (Francesco Akira and TJP) are the current champions in their first reign as a team. They won the titles by defeating Six or Nine (Ryusuke Taguchi and Master Wato) on June 20, 2022, at New Japan Road.

Title history

Combined reigns

By team

By wrestler

{| class="wikitable sortable" style="text-align:center;"
!Rank
!Wrestler
!No. ofreigns
!Combineddefenses
!Combined days
|-
!
|
|
|
|
|-
!rowspan=2|
|
|rowspan=2|
|rowspan=2|
|rowspan=2|
|-
|
|-
!
|
|rowspan=2|
|
|
|-
!
|
|
|
|-
!
|
|
|
|
|-
!
|
|rowspan=1|
|rowspan=1|
|rowspan=1|
|-
!rowspan=2|
|
|rowspan=2|
|rowspan=2|
|rowspan=2|
|-
|
|-
!
|
|
|
|
|-
!
|
|
|
|
|-
!rowspan=2|
|
|rowspan=2|
|rowspan=2|
|rowspan=2|
|-
|
|-
!
|
|rowspan=1|
|rowspan=1|
|rowspan=1|
|-
!rowspan=2|
|
|rowspan=2|
|rowspan=2|
|rowspan=2|
|-
|
|-
!
|
|
|
|
|-
!
|
|
|
|
|-
!
|
|
|
|
|-
!rowspan=2|
| 
|
|
|
|-
| 
|
|
|
|-
!
|
|
|
|
|-
!
|
|
|
|
|-
!
|
|
|
|
|-
!rowspan=2|
|style="background-color:#FFE6BD"| †
|rowspan=2|
|rowspan=2|
|rowspan=2|
|-
|style="background-color:#FFE6BD"| †
|-
!
|
|
|
|
|-
!rowspan=2|
|
|
|
|
|-
|
|
|
|
|-
!
|
|
|
|
|-
!
|
|
|rowspan=4|
|
|-
!
|
|
|
|-
!
|
|
|
|-
!
|
|
|
|-
!
|
|
|
|
|-
!
|
|
|
|
|-
!
|Master Wato
|rowspan=1|
|rowspan=1|
|rowspan=1|
|-
!
|
|
|
|
|-
!
|
|
|
|
|-
!rowspan=2|
|
|rowspan=2|
|rowspan=2|
|rowspan=2|
|-
|
|-
!rowspan=2|
|
|rowspan=2|
|rowspan=2|
|rowspan=2|
|-
|
|-
!
|
|
|
|
|-
!rowspan=2|
|
|rowspan=2|
|rowspan=2|
|rowspan=2|
|-
|
|-
!rowspan=2|
|
|rowspan=2|
|rowspan=2|
|rowspan=2|
|-
|
|-
!
|
|
|
|
|-
!
|
|
|
|
|-
!rowspan=2|
|
|rowspan=2|
|rowspan=2|
|rowspan=2|
|-
|
|-

References
General

Specific

External links
New Japan Pro-Wrestling.co.jp

New Japan Pro-Wrestling championships
Professional wrestling tag team champion lists